Sport Lisboa e Benfica, commonly known as Benfica, is a Portuguese professional football club based in Lisbon. Founded on 28 February 1904 as Sport Lisboa, it merged with Grupo Sport Benfica in 1908, thus being renamed Sport Lisboa e Benfica. The club's records and statistics here gathered only concern competitive, professional matches – no exhibition games are considered. These records and statistics include data on honours, players, transfers, managers, and team records, respectively.

Honours

Benfica is the most decorated club in Portugal, holding the records for most Primeira Liga, Taça de Portugal, and Taça da Liga titles, three of the four most important competitions in the country (the other being Supertaça Cândido de Oliveira). Moreover, Benfica is the only club to have won four consecutive editions of Taça de Portugal, from 1948–49 to 1952–53 (in 1949–50, the cup was not held), and four consecutive editions of Taça da Liga, from 2008–09 to 2011–12. On the international stage, Benfica have reached a record ten European finals, winning back-to-back European Cups in 1960–61 and 1961–62.

National titles
 Primeira Liga
 Winners (37) – record: 1935–36, 1936–37, 1937–38, 1941–42, 1942–43, 1944–45, 1949–50, 1954–55, 1956–57, 1959–60, 1960–61, 1962–63, 1963–64, 1964–65, 1966–67, 1967–68, 1968–69, 1970–71, 1971–72, 1972–73, 1974–75, 1975–76, 1976–77, 1980–81, 1982–83, 1983–84, 1986–87, 1988–89, 1990–91, 1993–94, 2004–05, 2009–10, 2013–14, 2014–15, 2015–16, 2016–17, 2018–19

 Taça de Portugal
 Winners (26) – record: 1939–40, 1942–43, 1943–44, 1948–49, 1950–51, 1951–52, 1952–53, 1954–55, 1956–57, 1958–59, 1961–62, 1963–64, 1968–69, 1969–70, 1971–72, 1979–80, 1980–81, 1982–83, 1984–85, 1985–86, 1986–87, 1992–93, 1995–96, 2003–04, 2013–14, 2016–17

 Supertaça Cândido de Oliveira
 Winners (8): 1980, 1985, 1989, 2005, 2014, 2016, 2017, 2019

 Taça da Liga
 Winners (7) – record: 2008–09, 2009–10, 2010–11, 2011–12, 2013–14, 2014–15, 2015–16

 Campeonato de Portugal
 Winners (3): 1929–30, 1930–31, 1934–35

UEFA titles
 European Cup
 Winners (2): 1960–61, 1961–62

Doubles
 Primeira Liga and Taça de Portugal
 11 – record: 1942–43, 1954–55, 1956–57, 1963–64, 1968–69, 1971–72, 1980–81, 1982–83, 1986–87, 2013–14, 2016–17
 Primeira Liga and Taça da Liga
 4 – record: 2009–10, 2013–14, 2014–15, 2015–16
 Taça de Portugal and Taça da Liga
 1 – shared record: 2013–14
 European Double
 1 – shared national record: 1960–61
 European Cup Double
 1 – national record: 1961–62

Trebles
 Primeira Liga, Taça de Portugal and Supertaça Cândido de Oliveira
 2 – record: 1980–81, 2016–17
 Primeira Liga, Taça de Portugal and Taça da Liga
 1 – record: 2013–14
 Primeira Liga, Taça da Liga and Supertaça Cândido de Oliveira
 1 – record: 2014–15

Players

Benfica's record appearance-maker is Nené, who made 575 appearances over the course of his career. Ten players have made more than 400 appearances, including four members of the 1961 European Cup-winning team. Eusébio is the club's top goalscorer with 473 goals in his 15-year spell. Only two other players have scored more than 300 goals for the club.

Appearances records
Most appearances in all competitions: Nené, 575.
Most league appearances: Nené, 422.
Most appearances in UEFA club competitions: Luisão, 127.
Most appearances in European Cup: Eusébio, 64.
Most appearances in UEFA Champions League: Luisão, 61.
Most appearances in UEFA Cup Winners' Cup: Humberto Coelho, 19.
Most appearances in UEFA Cup: Nuno Gomes, 30.
Most appearances in UEFA Europa League: Óscar Cardozo, 36.
Most appearances in Taça da Liga: Jardel, 30.
Most appearances in Supertaça Cândido de Oliveira: António Veloso, 16.
Most appearances in Derby de Lisboa: Francisco Albino, 56 (All-time record).
Most appearances in O Clássico: António Veloso, 45.
Youngest first-team player: Hugo Leal, 16 years and 335 days (against Espinho on 20 April 1997).
First foreign player: Jorge Gomes Filho, Brazilian (first match against Vitória de Setúbal on 29 August 1979).

Most appearances

Goal scoring records
Most goals scored in all competitions: Eusébio, 473.
Most goals scored in a season: Eusébio, 50 (1967–68).
Most league goals scored: Eusébio, 317.
Most league goals scored in a season: Eusébio, 42 (1967–68).
Most goals scored in UEFA club competitions: Eusébio, 56.
Most goals scored in European Cup: Eusébio, 46.
Most goals scored in UEFA Champions League: Óscar Cardozo, 11.
Most goals scored in UEFA Cup Winners' Cup:
Eusébio, 7.
Nené, 7.
Most goals scored in UEFA Cup: Nuno Gomes, 11.
Most goals scored in UEFA Europa League: Óscar Cardozo, 20.
Most goals scored in UEFA club competitions finals: Eusébio, 3 (2 in 1962 European Cup Final, 1 in 1963 European Cup Final).
Most goals scored in Taça de Portugal finals: Rogério Pipi, 15 (All-time record).
Most goals scored in Taça da Liga: Jonas, 10.
Most goals scored in Taça da Liga finals:
Rodrigo, 2 (1 in 2012 Final, 1 in 2014 Final – All-time joint record).
Jonas, 2 (1 in 2015 Final, 1 in 2016 Final – All-time joint record).
Kostas Mitroglou, 2 (2 in 2016 Final – All-time joint record).
Most goals scored in Supertaça Cândido de Oliveira: 
Nené, 3 (1 in 1980, 2 in 1981).
Pizzi, 3 (1 in 2016, 2 in 2019).
Most goals scored in Derby de Lisboa: Eusébio, 27.
Most goals scored in O Clássico: Eusébio, 25 (All-time record).
Most consecutive matches scoring at least one goal: Julinho, 12 (scored 20 times, from 16 October 1949 to 29 January 1950).
Youngest goalscorer: Fernando Chalana, 17 years, 7 months and 7 days (against Académica on 25 September 1976).
Most own-goals scored: Jardel, 4.

Top goalscorers

Top foreign goalscorers

Historical goals

Primeira Liga

UEFA competitions

Trophy winners
Most league titles: Eusébio, 11 (1960–61, 1962–63, 1963–64, 1964–65, 1966–67, 1967–68, 1968–69, 1970–71, 1971–72, 1972–73, 1974–75 – All-time record).
 Most Taça de Portugal titles: 
José Águas, 7 (1950–51, 1951–52, 1952–53, 1954–55, 1956–57, 1958–59, 1961–62)
Nené, 7 (1969–70, 1971–72, 1979–80, 1980–81, 1982–83, 1984–85, 1985–86)
Most Taça da Liga titles: Luisão, 7 (2008–09, 2009–10, 2010–11, 2011–12, 2013–14, 2014–15, 2015–16 – All-time record).
Most Supertaça Cândido de Oliveira titles: Luisão, 4 (2005, 2014, 2016, 2017).

Most titles won

Team captains

Individual award winners
Ballon d'Or: Eusébio, 1965.
European Golden Shoe:
Eusébio, 43 goals, 1967–68 (inaugural winner).
Eusébio, 40 goals, 1972–73.

Bola de Prata

Cosme Damião Award

Transfers

Highest transfer fees paid

Highest transfer fees received

Managerial records

First manager: Manuel Gourlade (first match against Carcavelos on 4 November 1906).
First foreign manager: Arthur John, English (first match against Sporting CP on 20 October 1929).

Managers with most seasons

Managers with most games, including wins

Trophy winners
First title: Cosme Damião, Campeonato de Lisboa (1909–10).
Most titles: Jorge Jesus, 10 (1 Taça de Portugal, 1 Supertaça Cândido de Oliveira, 3 Primeira Liga, 5 Taça da Liga).
Most Campeonato de Lisboa titles: Cosme Damião, 8 (1909–10, 1911–12, 1912–13 1913–14, 1915–16, 1916–17, 1917–18, 1919–20).
Most Campeonato de Portugal titles: Arthur John, 2 (1929–30, 1930–31).
Most Taça de Portugal titles:
János Biri, 3 (1939–40, 1942–43, 1943–44).
Otto Glória, 3 (1954–55, 1956–57, 1968–69).
Most Continental titles: Béla Guttmann, 2 (1960–61, 1961–62).
Most league titles: Otto Glória, 4 (1954–55, 1956–57, 1967–68, 1968–69).
Most Taça da Liga titles: Jorge Jesus, 5 (2009–10, 2010–11, 2011–12, 2013–14, 2014–15).
Most Supertaça Cândido de Oliveira titles: Rui Vitória, 2 (2016–17, 2017–18).
Most titles in a season:
Lajos Baróti, 3 (1980–81 – Supertaça Cândido de Oliveira, Primeira Liga and Taça de Portugal).
Jorge Jesus, 3 (2013–14 – Taça da Liga, Primeira Liga and Taça de Portugal).
Jorge Jesus, 3 (2014–15 – Supertaça Cândido de Oliveira, Primeira Liga and Taça da Liga).
Rui Vitória, 3 (2016–17 – Supertaça Cândido de Oliveira, Primeira Liga and Taça de Portugal).

Club records

Matches

Firsts
 First match: Carcavelos 3–1 Benfica, Campeonato de Lisboa, 4 November 1906.
 First Derby de Lisboa match: Benfica 1–2 Sporting CP, Campeonato de Lisboa, 1 December 1907.
 First Campeonato de Portugal match: Braga 3–4 Benfica (round of 16), 3 April 1927.
 First O Clássico match: Benfica 3–0 FC Porto, Campeonato de Portugal (final), 28 June 1931.
 First league match: Benfica 3–1 Vitória de Setúbal, 20 January 1935.
 First Taça de Portugal match: Luso SC 0–5 Benfica (Round 1 – first leg), 14 May 1939.
 First European Cup match: Sevilla 3–1 Benfica (Round 1 – first leg), 19 September 1957.
 First Intercontinental Cup match: Benfica 1–0 Peñarol (first leg), 6 September 1961.
 First UEFA Cup Winners' Cup match: Olimpija Ljubljana 1–1 Benfica (Round 1 – first leg), 16 September 1970.
 First UEFA Cup match: Nantes 0–2 Benfica (Round 1 – first leg), 13 September 1978.
 First Supertaça Cândido de Oliveira match: Sporting CP 2–2 Benfica (first leg), 10 September 1980.
 First UEFA Champions League match: Hajduk Split 0–0 Benfica (group stage), 14 September 1994.
 First match at Estádio da Luz: Benfica 1–2 Beira-Mar (Primeira Liga), 2 November 2003.
 First Taça da Liga match: Estrela da Amadora 1–1 Benfica (4–5, pso) (Round 3), 26 September 2007.
 First UEFA Europa League match: Benfica 4–0 Vorskla Poltava (Play-off round – first leg), 20 August 2009.

Wins
 Record win: Lisboa FC 0–15 Benfica, Campeonato de Lisboa, 9 April 1911.
 Record Campeonato de Portugal win: União Operário 1–8 Benfica (Round 1), 30 March 1930.
 Record O Clássico win: Benfica 12–2 FC Porto (Primeira Liga) (All-time record), 7 February 1943.
 Record Derby de Lisboa win:
Benfica 5–0 Sporting CP, Campeonato de Lisboa, 3 December 1939.
Benfica 7–2 Sporting CP, Primeira Liga, 28 April 1946.
Benfica 5–0 Sporting CP, Primeira Liga, 19 November 1978.
Benfica 5–0 Sporting CP, Taça de Portugal (quarterfinals), 12 March 1986.
Benfica 5–0 Sporting CP, Supertaça Cândido de Oliveira, 4 August 2019.
 Record league win: Benfica 13–1 Sanjoanense, 27 April 1947.
 Record Intercontinental Cup win: Benfica 1–0 Peñarol (first leg), 6 September 1961.
 Record European Cup win: Benfica 10–0 Stade Dudelange (preliminary round – second leg), 5 October 1965.
 Record UEFA Cup Winners' Cup win: Benfica 8–1 Olimpija Ljubljana (Round 1 – second leg), 30 September 1970.
 Record Taça de Portugal win: Benfica 14–1 Riachense (round of 16), 11 January 1989.
 Record UEFA Cup win: Belvedur Izola 0–5 Benfica (first round – second leg), 30 September 1992.
 Record UEFA Champions League win: Benfica 6–0 Beitar Jerusalem (Second qualifying round – first leg), 12 August 1998.
 Record UEFA Europa League win: Benfica 5–0 Everton (group stage), 22 October 2009.
 Record Taça da Liga win: Moreirense 1–6 Benfica (Round 3), 26 January 2016.
 Record Supertaça Cândido de Oliveira win: Benfica 5–0 Sporting CP, 4 August 2019.

Defeats
 Record defeat:
 Benfica 0–8 Império, Campeonato de Lisboa, 30 October 1927.
Porto 8–0 Benfica, Campeonato de Portugal (quarterfinals – first leg), 28 May 1933.
 Record Taça de Portugal defeat: Benfica 1–6 Porto (semifinals – first leg), 11 June 1939.
 Record Intercontinental Cup win: Peñarol 5–0 Benfica (second leg) (All-time record), 17 September 1961.
 Record European Cup defeat: Borussia Dortmund 5–0 Benfica (Round 1 – second leg), 4 December 1963.
 Record UEFA Cup Winners' Cup defeat:
Vorwärts Berlin 2–0 Benfica (Round 2 – second leg), 4 November 1970.
Benfica 0–2 Fiorentina (Quarter-finals – first leg), 6 March 1997.
 Record league defeat: Sporting CP 7–1 Benfica, 14 December 1986.
 Record Supertaça Cândido de Oliveira defeat: Benfica 0–5 Porto, 18 September 1996.
 Record UEFA Cup defeat: Celta Vigo 7–0 Benfica (third round – first leg), 25 November 1999
 Record UEFA Europa League defeat: Liverpool 4–1 (quarterfinals – second leg), 8 April 2010.
 Record Taça da Liga defeat: Moreirense 3–1 Benfica (semifinals), 26 January 2017.
 Record UEFA Champions League defeat: Basel 5–0 Benfica (group stage), 27 September 2017.

Streaks
Longest unbeaten run (all competitions): 48 matches (from 22 December 1963 to 14 February 1965).
Longest league winning run: 29 matches (from 9 April 1972 to 11 March 1973) (European record).
Longest winning run (all domestic competitions): 34 matches (from 9 April 1972 to 18 March 1973).
Longest unbeaten league run: 56 matches (from 27 October 1974 to 1 September 1978).
Longest winning run (all competitions): 18 matches (from 12 December 2010 to 2 March 2011) (domestic joint record).
Longest period without conceding a home goal (all competitions): 941 minutes (from the 37' on 10 December 2013 to the 78' on 20 March 2014).
Longest away winning streak (all competitions): 11 matches (from 2 January 2016 to 20 March 2016).
Longest away winning streak (league): 16 matches (from 2 January 2016 to 23 October 2016).

Goals
Fewest league goals scored in a season: 34 in 14 matches (1937–38).
Most league goals scored in a season:
103 in 26 matches (1963–64).
103 in 34 matches (2018–19).
Fewest league goals conceded in a season: 11 in 30 matches (1977–78).
Most league goals conceded in a season: 48 in 34 matches (1989–90).

Points

League
Most points in a season:
Two points for a win: 69 in 38 matches (1990–91) (domestic record).
Three points for a win: 88 in 34 matches (2015–16) (domestic joint record).
Fewest points in a season:
Two points for a win: 18 in 14 matches (1940–41).
Three points for a win: 52 in 30 matches (2007–08).

European Cup group stage
Most/Fewest points in a season: 5 in 6 matches (1991–92).

UEFA Champions League group stage
Most points in a season:
Two points for a win: 9 in 6 matches (1994–95).
Three points for a win: 14 in 6 matches (2022–23).
Fewest points in a season:
Two points for a win: 9 in 6 matches (1994–95).
Three points for a win: 0 in 6 matches (2017–18) (domestic record).

UEFA Cup group stage
Most points in a season: 9 in 4 matches (2004–05).
Fewest points in a season: 1 in 4 matches (2008–09).

UEFA Europa League group stage
Most points in a season: 15 in 6 matches (2009–10).
Fewest points in a season: 12 in 6 matches (2020–21).

See also
European association football club records

References

Records and statistics
R
B